Ahmed Mohamed Abdelaziz Mohamed (born April 27, 1988), also known as Ahmed Mohamed, is an Egyptian male weightlifter, competing in the +105 kg category and representing Egypt at international competitions. Mohamed participated in the men's +105 kg event at the 2015 World Weightlifting Championships, and at the 2016 Summer Olympics, where he failed to register a single lift in all three attempts of the clean and jerk phase.

Major results

References

External links
 
 
 

1988 births
Living people
Egyptian male weightlifters
Place of birth missing (living people)
Weightlifters at the 2016 Summer Olympics
Olympic weightlifters of Egypt
Mediterranean Games bronze medalists for Egypt
Mediterranean Games medalists in weightlifting
Competitors at the 2005 Mediterranean Games
African Games medalists in weightlifting
Competitors at the 2015 African Games
African Games silver medalists for Egypt
21st-century Egyptian people
20th-century Egyptian people